Marapoama is a municipality in the state of São Paulo in Brazil. The population is 3,064 (2020 est.) in an area of 111 km². The elevation is 467.0 m.

References

Municipalities in São Paulo (state)